The Ataye is a river in central Ethiopia. It is a tributary of the Awash River.

References

Awash River
Rivers of Ethiopia